Shadowland is the debut solo album by k.d. lang, released in 1988 (see 1988 in music). The album included her collaboration with Kitty Wells, Loretta Lynn and Brenda Lee on "Honky Tonk Angels' Medley" and was produced by Owen Bradley, who produced Patsy Cline's best-known work.

Track listing

Side one
"Western Stars" (Chris Isaak) - 3:12
"Lock, Stock and Teardrops" (Roger Miller) – 3:28
"Sugar Moon" (Cindy Walker, Bob Wills) – 2:26
"I Wish I Didn't Love You So" (Frank Loesser) – 3:07
"(Waltz Me) Once Again Around the Dance Floor" (Don Goodman, Sara Johns, Jack Rowland) – 2:35
"Black Coffee" (Sonny Burke, Paul Francis Webster) – 3:17

Side two
"Shadowland" (Dick Hyman, Charles Tobias) – 2:28
"Don't Let the Stars Get in Your Eyes" (Slim Willet) – 2:20
"Tears Don't Care Who Cries Them" (Fred Tobias, Charles Tobias) – 3:03
"I'm Down to My Last Cigarette" (Harlan Howard, Billy Walker) – 2:46
"Busy Being Blue" (Stewart MacDougall) – 3:40
"Honky Tonk Angels' Medley" – 2:55
"In the Evening (When the Sun Goes Down)" (Leroy Carr, Don Raye)
"You Nearly Lose Your Mind" (Ernest Tubb)
"Blues Stay Away from Me" (Alton Delmore, Rabon Delmore, Wayne Raney, Henry Glover)

Personnel
k.d.lang - vocals
Harold Bradley - banjo, bass, ukulele, gut string guitar
Jimmy Capps - rhythm guitar
Buddy Emmons - pedal steel guitar
Greg Leisz - lap steel guitar
Tony Migliore - piano, accordion
Roger Morris - piano
Hargus "Pig" Robbins - piano
Hal Rugg - pedal steel guitar
Buddy Spicher - fiddle
Henry Strzelecki - bass
Pete Wade - electric guitar
Rob Hajacos - fiddle
Buddy Harman - drums
Jim Horn - saxophone
The Nashville String Machine
Bill McElhiney - arrangements
David Angell - violin
Roy Christensen - cello
Connie Ellisor - violin
Ted Madsen - violin
Bob Mason - cello
Pamela Sixfin - violin
Carl Gorodetzky - violin
Dennis Molchan - violin
George Binkley III - violin
John Borg - viola
Gary VanOsdale - viola
Anthony LaMarchina - cello
Lee Larrison - violin
The Jordanaires - vocals on "Western Stars", "I Wish I Didn't Love You So" & "Tears Don't Care Who Cries Them"
Gordon Stoker
Louis Dean Nunley
Neal Matthews, Jr.
Duane West
Tennessee - vocals on "Lock, Stock and Teardrops", "Sugar Moon", "Don't Let the Stars Get in Your Eyes" & "I'm Down to My Last Cigarette"
Hurshel Wiginton
Doug Clements
Louis Dean Nunley
Jim Ferguson
The Honky Tonk Angels - vocals on "Honky Tonk Angels' Medley"
Brenda Lee
Loretta Lynn
Kitty Wells

Production
Producer: Owen Bradley
Engineer: Bobby Bradley

Chart performance

Weekly charts

Year-end charts

Certifications

References

K.d. lang albums
1988 debut albums
Albums produced by Owen Bradley
Sire Records albums
Canadian Country Music Association Album of the Year albums